Matyas Veress is a film editor with more than thirty film credits. His career started in 1993 as the assistant editor on the film Just Friends. He received the Magritte Award for Best Editing for his work in the 2009 film Mr. Nobody.

References

External links

Belgian film editors
Living people
Magritte Award winners
Year of birth missing (living people)